Triclopyr (3,5,6-trichloro-2-pyridinyloxyacetic acid) is an organic compound in the pyridine group that is used as a systemic foliar herbicide and fungicide.

Uses 
Triclopyr is used to control broadleaf weeds while leaving grasses and conifers unaffected or to control rust diseases on crops.

Triclopyr is effective on woody plants and is used for brush control in the right-of-way and defoliation of wooded areas.  In the USA, it is sold under the trade names Garlon, Remedy, and many others, and in the UK as SBK Brushwood Killer.

It is also used for broadleaf weeds, particularly creeping charlie (Glechoma hederacea).  It is sold under the trade names Turflon, Weed-B-Gon (purple label), and Brush-B-Gon ("Poison Ivy Killer") for these purposes.  It is a major ingredient in Confront, which was withdrawn from most uses due to concerns about compost contamination from the other major ingredient, clopyralid.

Environmental effects 
Triclopyr breaks down in soil with a half-life between 30 and 90 days. It degrades rapidly in water, and remains active in decaying vegetation for about 3 months.

The compound is slightly toxic to ducks (LD50 = 1698 mg/kg) and quail (LD50 = 3000 mg/kg). It has been found nontoxic to bees and very slightly toxic to fish (rainbow trout LC50 (96 hr) = 117 ppm).

Garlon's fact sheet for their triclopyr ester product indicates that triclopyr is highly toxic to fish, aquatic plants, and aquatic invertebrates, and should never be used in waterways, wetlands, or other sensitive habitats. This is only for the triclopyr ester product, not for the triclopyr amine product.

References

External links 
 archived Triclopyr Technical Fact Sheet – National Pesticide Information Center
 Triclopyr General Fact Sheet – National Pesticide Information Center
 Triclopyr Pesticide Information Profile – Extension Toxicology Network
 

Auxinic herbicides
Chloropyridines
Carboxylic acids
Ethers
Fungicides
Pyridines